The Aquarium of Western Australia (AQWA) is a privately owned aquarium in Hillarys, Western Australia. AQWA was Australia's largest aquarium when it opened and still possesses Australia's largest single aquarium and walk-through underwater tunnel.

History

The aquarium opened on 13 April 1988 as Underwater World, Perth. It was acquired by the current owners, Coral World International and Morris Kahn, in 1991, and changed its name to AQWA The Aquarium of Western Australia on 1 January 2001.

AQWA (then Underwater World, Perth) opened with only two aquariums, the feature walk-through aquarium, now known as the Shipwreck Coast, and the Touch Pool. It now includes more than 40 exhibits and is the 10th largest aquarium in the world.

From 1992 to 1999 the aquarium hosted a family of dolphins enclosed in a sea pen, which later died due to unknown causes - possibly stress.

Exhibits

AQWA is themed as an underwater journey along W.A.'s coastline and is broken up into 5 distinct areas. Each area represents the unique marine life and environments of different regions along W.A.'s coast.

These include:
The Great Southern, the Shipwreck Coast, the Perth Coast, the Far North and Marmion Marine Park.

It incorporates a  underwater acrylic tunnel, the largest in Australia. This exhibit contains  grey nurse shark,  smooth stingrays, large loggerhead turtles and over 70 other species of rays, octopuses, sharks and fish.

The facility is host to two premiere feature exhibits:
 The Coral Reef: AQWA's Coral Reef is one of the largest living coral reef exhibits in the world, featuring stunning living corals and reef fish from Rottnest Island.
 The DangerZone: featuring a line-up of W.A.'s dangerous marine life including stonefish, sea snake, blue ringed octopus, lion fish, box fish and cone shells.

Other featured animals include leafy seadragons, moon jellyfish, clownfish, juvenile saltwater crocodiles, starfish, octopus, cuttlefish, rock lobsters, scorpionfish, eagle ray, sandbar shark, blacktip shark, Port Jackson shark, rescued turtles and many more.

AQWA adventures

For a fee, snorkelers and qualified scuba divers can get even closer to the fish, sharks, rays and turtles by joining the aquarium's dive master in the Dive or Snorkel with Sharks program. It is held daily in the main Shipwreck Coast aquarium.

Seasonally, AQWA also runs the Reefwalker program, where capable swimmers over the age of 12 are able to enter the coral reef and discover scuba diving. No qualifications are required. Using a custom-made hookah scuba unit, participants are led by an experienced AQWA dive instructor, as they walk underwater through the living reef which features hundreds of corals and fish. It runs Friday–Sunday between October and April.

References

External links

Aquaria in Australia
Tourist attractions in Perth, Western Australia
1988 establishments in Australia
Buildings and structures in Perth, Western Australia
Coral World International's Public Aquariums